Avondale FC is an Australian semi-professional association football club, with the men's and women's teams based in Parkville and the junior sides based in Avondale Heights, suburbs of Melbourne, Victoria. The club competes in the National Premier Leagues Victoria, having reached the top tier of Victorian football in 2015.

History

Early years
Avondale FC was founded in 1984 as Keilor I.C.K.A.. ICKA stood for Italian Community of Keilor Assoc Inc. (I.C.K.A. Club), the football team having been founded originally by Italian immigrants.

Keilor ICKA competed in the Victorian Amateur League Division 3 in 1986, and achieved two consecutive promotions in '86 and '87 to rise to the Amateur League Division 1 by '88. Keilor competed in the Provisional Leagues for the first time in 1991, with the federation placing the club into Victorian Provisional League Division 4 that year, the ninth tier of football in Victoria. The club was promoted the following year, a third-place finish enough to see the club rise to Provisional League Division 3. Keilor was to spend the next eight years at that level.

After moving to Doyle Street Reserve in Avondale Heights in 1999, the club was renamed to Avondale Heights SC in 2000. That year proved to be a memorable one for the Melbourne club, finally achieving promotion to Provisional League Division 2 North-West, by taking out the Division 3 North-West title, losing just one game all season. The next year was even better, with the club taking out the Div 2 Nth-West title in their first season at that level, finishing five points clear at the top of the table ahead of Mill Park.

Avondale Heights' next promotion was to come in 2006, when the club finished second in the Provisional League Division 1 North-West. This promotion meant that the club would compete in the Victorian State Leagues for the first time, entering State League Division 3 North-West for the 2007 season. Devastatingly, the club were relegated on the final game of the 2007 season, finishing just one point of survival. The club endured another relegation the following season, falling to the sixth tier of Victorian football for the 2008 season.

League ascension
A famous climb through the league divisions began in 2009 when a new committee took over the management of the club. Avondale managed a second-place finish in the Provisional League Division 2 North-West, enough for promotion. Avondale was promoted once more the following season, the club again finishing second, this time in the Provisional League Division 1 North-West.

In 2012, Avondale Heights appointed Anthony Barbieri as head manager of the senior side. They were promoted from State League 3 North-West to State League 2 North-West after topping their league table and taking out the Championship, pipping Sydenham Park SC by just one point. In 2013, the club were promoted from State League 2 in their first season in the competition, then from the third division of football in Victoria, after winning a playoff against North Geelong Warriors 1–0.

National Premier Leagues Victoria
In 2014, Avondale Heights entered the second tier of football in Victoria, the National Premier Leagues Victoria 2, for the first time ever. Avondale went on to win the league championship and earn promotion into the NPL Victoria top division. The club achieved five promotions in six seasons to reach the top flight, a feat that is unrivaled in Victorian football.

Avondale Heights Soccer Club changed its name to Avondale Football Club in 2015. The club grabbed headlines around Victoria in May 2015 when it confirmed the signings of former A-League players Francesco Stella and Massimo Murdocca. In their first season in the top flight of Victorian football, the club managed to avoid relegation, finishing mid-table.

Avondale announced that it had signed two more former A-League players in Spase Dilevski and Jonatan Germano for the 2016 season. Avondale adopted the moniker The Avengers in early 2016 and announced it would be playing home matches for the 2016 season out of Knights Stadium. On the park, it was a difficult season early on for Avondale, who lost its opening five fixtures. A draw against Oakleigh Cannons was followed up by three consecutive victories, but inconsistent form throughout the season, which included another five match losing streak followed by closing out the season eight games undefeated, saw Avondale finish in 8th place for 2016. Jonatan Germano was a clear standout for Avondale, netting 14 goals from midfield including five braces.

In 2017 Avondale qualified for the NPL Victoria finals series for the first time, continuing the club's rise. Avondale even led the league by Round 19, but a stretch of four matches without a win saw Heidelberg United and South Melbourne surpass them in the standings. Avondale faced Oakleigh Cannons in the Elimination Final, losing 2–1 in extra time. Germano was once more the side's top goalscorer, with eight goals. Avondale conceded the fewest goals of any side in the league but also scored fewer goals than all but the two bottom-placed sides, North Geelong Warriors and St Albans Saints.

In December 2017, the club announced that it had signed a 10-year lease with the Reggio Calabria Club in Brunswick to become the new home base for the club. Avondale played its 2018 home games at Paisley Park Soccer Complex prior to the move. In June 2018, Avondale moved into its new home ground in Parkville, Victoria, newly named 'Avenger Park'. Avondale announced that the club would be completing new change-rooms, a kiosk, medical center, gym, members sports bar and a 450-seat grandstand at the venue.

Avondale bolstered its offensive unit with the signings of Joseph Katebian, Kaine Sheppard, Stefan Zinni, Elvis Kamsoba and Liam Boland in the off-season. In May 2018, Avondale qualified for the 2018 FFA Cup national stages after a 4–1 victory over Richmond, the first time in its history it had made the national stages of the Cup. Drawing former National Soccer League side and four-time Australian national champion Marconi Stallions in the Round of 32, Avondale defeated its opponents 4–1 at ABD Stadium. Avondale progressed to the Quarter Finals when it defeated Devonport Strikers 4-1 and drew A-League champions Sydney FC. Despite coming back from 2-0 down at half-time, Avondale took the game to extra-time and were eventually defeated 4–2 in front of 1,566 people, the club's largest ever attendance.

In the league, Avondale finished in 3rd place in 2018, its highest position to date. In the finals series, they defeated Port Melbourne 3–1 at Avenger Park before staging an incredible comeback at Kingston Heath Soccer Complex against Bentleigh Greens, scoring three goals in the last five minutes of extra time, taking the tie from 3–1 to Bentleigh to 4–3 to Avondale, securing their first ever NPL grand final appearance. In the Grand Final, Avondale went down 2–1 to Heidelberg United at AAMI Park. Two of Avondale's stand-out players joined A-League sides after the season, with Sheppard moving to Newcastle Jets and Kamsoba signing for Melbourne Victory.

At the conclusion of the season, after seven seasons at the helm of the club, senior head coach Anthony Barbieri departed Avondale. His assistant coach, Zoran Markovski, was named as his successor in December 2018. In his playing days, Markovski was a two-time National Soccer League championship winning defender with Melbourne Croatia. Avondale started the season with 7 consecutive league wins, remained undefeated until Round 13 and led the league for most of the season. Poor form in the latter stages of the season, including a 3–2 loss to Heidelberg in the second-last round of the regular season saw the Avengers slip to 2nd place. Liam Boland won the league Golden Boot with 22 goals, while Tasuku Sekiya won the Bill Fleming Media Award. In the finals series, Avondale beat Oakleigh 2-0 before going down on penalties to Bentleigh in the Grand Final at AAMI Park.

NPL Licence Breaches
One day prior to the start of the 2020 season, Football Victoria announced that Avondale FC breached conditions of its NPL Licence in 2018 and 2019. Subsequently, the club was fined $25,000, deducted 3 points for the 2020 NPL Victoria season, awarded a suspended $25,000 fine and 18-point deduction for the 2020 season, retrospectively deducted 18 points for the 2018 and 2019 seasons and required to pay back all prize-money awarded in 2018 and 2019.

2021 Suspended Season
The season was disrupted due to the impacts from the COVID-19 pandemic in Australia, with the season being cancelled in September. Avondale was on top of the ladder at the time, but no Premier was declared. However, as a result of a court challenge involving Avondale and Football Victoria, it was agreed that eight rounds of games from the 2022 NPL Season would also count towards the 2021 NPL league table, enabling sufficient matches to be played to "complete" the season, and be able to declare a Premier.

Current squad

Honours

State
 Victorian State League 3 NW Champions: 2012
 National Premier Leagues Victoria 1 Champions: 2014
 Dockerty Cup Winners: 2021

Women's football
Avondale fielded a senior women's team for the first time in 2019, entering a side in the Victorian Women's State League 4 West competition. Avondale clinched the league title after round 14 after 14 consecutive victories, and ended the season with 16 wins from 16 games, scoring 110 and conceding just 4 goals. In the State League 4 finals, Avondale beat RMIT FC 9-0 and Port Melbourne SC on penalties to complete an "Invincibles" season.

References

External links
 Official club website

Victorian Premier League teams
National Premier Leagues clubs
1984 establishments in Australia
Italian-Australian culture in Melbourne
Italian-Australian backed sports clubs of Victoria
Soccer clubs in Melbourne
Sport in the City of Moonee Valley
Sport in the City of Merri-bek